Ricardo Campos da Costa (born 8 June 1976) is a Brazilian former professional footballer who played as a midfielder.

Club career
He played for FC Seoul, Seongnam Ilhwa Chunma, Busan IPark of the South Korean K League.

Style of play 
Ricardo was considered to be one of the best and versatile midfielders in K League. He played in several midfield positions during his career, his main midfield position is defensive midfielder, but he also played as attacking midfielder in K League.

References

External links
 Ricardo Facebook Page
 

1976 births
Living people
Brazilian footballers
Association football midfielders
K League 1 players
Marília Atlético Clube players
FC Seoul players
Seongnam FC players
Busan IPark players
Brazilian expatriate footballers
Brazilian expatriate sportspeople in South Korea
Expatriate footballers in South Korea